Dehradun Airport , also known as Jolly Grant Airport, is a domestic airport serving Dehradun, the capital of Uttarakhand, India, located 25 km south of the city. Commercial operations began on 30 March 2008, after a runway extension to accommodate larger aircraft. A new terminal building was inaugurated in February 2009. The current passenger terminal was inaugurated in October 2021.

It is also known as the Air Gateway of Garhwal and plays an important role in the tourism of Uttarakhand.

History

Dehradun Airport was constructed in 1974. Vayudoot operated scheduled services to New Delhi, Lucknow and Pantnagar from 1982 to 1995. Air Deccan started flights between Dehradun and New Delhi in December 2004 and added a second daily flight from August 2006.

The Airport Authority of India suspended flight operations at the airport from 1 March 2007 in order to execute its airport modernization plan. The runway was extended from 3,500 feet to 7,000 feet and also broadened from 23 metres to 45 metres to enable the landing of narrow body jets like the Boeing 737 and the Airbus 320. A night landing system was installed and a new terminal building and ATC tower were also constructed.

The expansion work was expected to cost ₹720 million and was to be completed by the end of 2007. However, it took a few months more and scheduled flights resumed only in March 2008 with Air Deccan re-launching its flights. Air India launched its Delhi to Dehradun services on 28 January 2010, followed by SpiceJet in 2012.

Terminal building
The domestic terminal building at the airport is a 4,200 square metre glass and steel structure with central air conditioning, central heating, a Flight Information Display System (FIDS) and CCTV surveillance systems. The terminal has peak-hour passenger handling capacity of 150 passengers and annual handling capacity of 122,000. It has 11 check-in counters, an X-ray baggage scanner, three security check booths in the Departures section and two baggage claim conveyor belts in the arrivals section. Its adjoining airport apron can accommodate two Category 'C' type of aircraft.

In September 2018, AAI approached the Ministry of Environment, Forest and Climate Change (MoEFCC) for clearance to expand the airport by constructing a new integrated terminal building and allied facilities at an investment of Rs 344.75 crore. A new, centrally air-conditioned Modular Integrated Terminal Building is built on an area of 17,961 square metres and has a built-up area of 30,200 square metres.
The new terminal building has a concourse, check-in area, security hold and arrival lounge on the ground floor. Offices will be accommodated on the mezzanine floor. Departures will have  36 check-in counters, self-check-in kiosks, in-line baggage screening facility and four aerobridges. Retail space will be spread over an area of 6,465 square metres.

New terminal building 
In order to meet the expected increase in passenger footfall in the future, Dehradun Airport is all set to receive a full makeover. The cost of the redevelopment project is estimated at Rs 353 crores. According to Airports Authority of India (AAI), the first phase of development will include the construction of Domestic Terminal Building along with a utility block, a car park, sewage treatment plant, rainwater harvesting facilities and other ancillary structures.

AAI said in a statement, "With an area of 42,776 sqm, the new terminal building will be able to handle around 1,800 passengers during peak hours, thereby expanding the capacity of the airport by eightfold. The new terminal building will have a concourse, check-in area, security hold and arrival lounge on the ground floor, security hold at first floor, and various offices on the mezzanine floor.

As per the project details, equipped with 36 check-in counters and four aerobridges, the new terminal building will have facilities like self-check-in kiosks and an inline baggage screening facility, along with retail space.

AAI further said in its statement that the second phase of the development work will include shifting of operations from the existing terminal building to the new one and construction of the remaining portion of the terminal building along with the integration of all the services and completion of balance works. The project was completed and inaugurated by Aviation Minister Jyotiraditya Scindia on 7 October 2021.

Airlines and destinations

Statistics

See also
 List of airports in India

References

External links

Transport in Dehradun
Science and technology in Dehradun
Airports in Uttarakhand
Buildings and structures in Dehradun
1974 establishments in Uttar Pradesh
Airports established in 1974
20th-century architecture in India